William David Thomas (March 22, 1880 – May 17, 1936) was an American pharmacist and politician from Hoosick Falls, New York. A Republican, he was most notable for his service as a member of the United States House of Representatives from New York, a position he held from 1934 until his death.

A native of Middle Granville, New York, Thomas graduated from Albany College of Pharmacy  in 1904 and settled in Hoosick Falls, where he operated a pharmacy. Thomas also became involved in banking and other business ventures.

A Republican, Thomas served as town clerk of Hoosick from 1917 to 1925. In 1925 and 1926, he served in the New York State Assembly. From 1927 to 1933 he served as treasurer of Rensselaer County. He was chairman of the county's Republican Party from 1927 to 1934.

In January 1934, Thomas won a special election for a seat in the United States House of Representatives. He won election to a full term in November 1934 and served from January 30, 1934 until his death. He died in Washington, D.C., on May 17, 1936, before the expiration of his Congressional term. Thomas was buried at Maple Grove New Cemetery in Hoosick Falls.

Early life
William D. Thomas was born in Middle Granville, New York, on March 22, 1880, the eldest son of David T. Thomas and Mary Rebecca (McKenzie) Thomas. He attended the schools of Middle Granville, and graduated from Middle Granville High School in 1897. In 1904, he graduated from the Albany College of Pharmacy with a Graduate of Pharmacy (Ph. G.) degree.

Career
Thomas settled in Hoosick Falls, New York, in 1905, where he was a partner in a pharmacy, Smith & Thomas. In 1906, he purchased his partner's share, after which he owned and operated the business as Thomas Pharmacy. Thomas was active in banking and finance, including serving on the board of directors of the Permanent Savings and Loan Association of Hoosick Falls and the Peoples First National Bank.

A Republican, Thomas served as town clerk of Hoosick from 1917 to 1925. He was a member of the New York State Assembly (Rensselaer Co., 2nd D.) in 1925 and 1926. From 1927 to 1933, Taylor served as treasurer of Rensselaer County. From 1927 to 1934, he was chairman of the Rensselaer County Republican Committee. Thomas was also active in civic and fraternal organizations, including the Masons and Elks, and he served both organizations in leadership roles. In addition, he was an honorary member of United Spanish War Veterans.

In 1934, Thomas was elected to the United States House of Representatives, filling the vacancy caused by the death of James S. Parker. He served from January 30, 1934, until his death in Washington, D.C., on May 17, 1936. He was buried at Maple Grove Cemetery in Hoosick Falls.

Family
In 1907, Thomas married Carolyn G. Haffner of Brooklyn. They were the parents of a daughter, Lillian H. Thomas. Lillian Thomas was the wife of Aubrey Brownell of Hamburg, New York.

Carolyn Haffner Thomas was a graduate of Girls' Normal School in Brooklyn and taught school before her marriage. She played an important role in the career of painter Grandma Moses. In the mid-1930s, Carolyn Thomas asked Moses to take part in a display for the Hoosick Falls Women's Exchange. Several of Moses' paintings were exhibited at the Thomas Pharmacy as part of this project, and they were noticed by art collector Louis J. Caldor. Caldor purchased them and began to publicize and exhibit Moses' work, which led to her achieving international fame.

See also
 List of United States Congress members who died in office (1900–49)

References

External links

1880 births
1936 deaths
People from Granville, New York
People from Hoosick Falls, New York
Republican Party members of the New York State Assembly
Republican Party members of the United States House of Representatives from New York (state)
20th-century American politicians